Fenglingdu is a town in Ruicheng County, Yuncheng, Shanxi, China. , it administers Fenghuang Residential Community and the following 34 villages:
Zhao Village
Xiwang Village
Puzi Village
Dongzhang Village
Tianshang Village
Tanguo Village
Sanjiao Village
Handu Village
Xiaoli Village
Beijieyi Village
Gaojia Village
Zhongji Village
Houfeng Village
Beiqu Village
Qili Village
Zhongyao New Village
Wangyao Village
Yaoke Village
Shangtian Village
Liuguan Village
Wangliao Village
Gulun Village
Xihoudu Village
Kehe Village
Huawang Village
Xiyang Village
Luwang Village
Dongbaitai Village
Xibaitai Village
Tian Village
Jiaolu Village
Yangxian Village
Dongsan Village
Xitaiyang Village

Fenglingdu is located on the Yellow River, and across the river is Tongguan County. It had 69,998 people.

Transportation 
The area is served by Fenglingdu railway station.

References 

Township-level divisions of Shanxi
Ruicheng County